Live in Concert is a live album by the Irish folk group Clannad which was released in 2005. It features new versions of material from across the band's catalogue as far back as their 1973 debut album. Songs originally released in their simplest acoustic form are now performed here with brand new full band arrangements. "In A Lifetime" features a duet with former Riverdance singer Brian Kennedy. An 11-minute medley of music from the Robin of Sherwood TV series features previously unreleased music. The album was compiled from concerts recorded during their 1996 European tour.

The album was released as a free CD with the Irish Mail On Sunday newspaper on 17 October 2010, under the title "The Collection". The CD omitted "Dance & Téidhir Abhaile Riú" and edited the "Robin of Sherwood Medley" from 11:22 to 4:00.

Track listing
 "Newgrange"
 "An tÚll"
 "Thíos Fán Chósta"
 "In a Lifetime"
 "Trail of Tears"
 "Dúlamán"
 "Theme from Harry's Game"
 "Robin of Sherwood Medley: Robin (The Hooded Man) / Herne / Ancient Forest / Lady Marian / Royal /..."
 "Down by the Sally Gardens"
 "Níl Sé'n Lá"
 "Dance & Teidhir Abhaile Riú Medley: Dance / Luasc / Teidhir Abhaille"

Personnel

Clannad
Clannad – Arranger, Main Performer
Máire Brennan – Harp, Vocals
Ciarán Brennan – Acoustic Guitar, Bass, Vocals, Keyboard, Arranger
Pádraig Duggan – Acoustic Guitar, Mandolin, Vocals
Noel Duggan – Acoustic Guitar, Vocals

Other musicians
Ian Parker – Keyboards
Ray Fean – Percussion
Deirdre Brennan – Vocals, Bodhran
Ian Melrose – Acoustic Guitar, Electric Guitar
Brian Kennedy – Vocals
Mel Collins – Flute, Saxophone
Vinnie Kilduff – Mandolin

Production
Chris O'Brien and Graham Murphy – Mixing
Richard Dowling – Mastering
Gary Kelly – Design
Carmen Cordelia – Cover Photo

References

External links
 This album at Northern Skyline

Clannad albums
2005 live albums